Walter Corsanini (born July 25, 1911 in Cremona) was an Italian professional football player.

He played 2 games in the Serie A in the 1929/30 season for A.S. Roma.

1911 births
Year of death missing
Italian footballers
Serie A players
U.S. Cremonese players
A.S. Roma players
Mantova 1911 players
Cosenza Calcio 1914 players
U.S. Salernitana 1919 players
L'Aquila Calcio 1927 players
Association football midfielders